Larina is a genus of large operculate freshwater snails, aquatic gastropod mollusks in the family Viviparidae.

Species
Species within the genus Larina include 
 Larina lirata (Tate, 1885)
 Larina strangei A. Adams, 1855
Species brought into synonymy
 Larina turbinata Gatliff & Gabriel, 1909: synonym of Larinopsis turbinatus (Gatliff & Gabriel, 1909)

References

Viviparidae